The 2006 New York Yankees season was the Yankees' 104th season. The season finished with the Yankees winning the AL East Division. They were defeated in the ALDS by the Detroit Tigers, 3 games to 1.

Offseason
January 3, 2006: Bernie Williams signed as a free agent with the New York Yankees.
January 30, 2006: Ramiro Mendoza was signed as a free agent with the New York Yankees.
Sal Fasano signed with the New York Yankees.

Regular season

Season standings

Record vs. opponents

Transactions
June 6, 2006: Ian Kennedy was drafted by the New York Yankees in the 1st round (21st pick) of the 2006 amateur draft. Player signed August 17, 2006.
June 6, 2006: Joba Chamberlain was drafted by the New York Yankees in the 1st round (41st pick) of the 2006 amateur draft. Player signed September 2, 2006.

Roster

Game log

|- style="text-align:center;background-color:#bbffbb"
| 1 || April 3 || Yankees || 15–2 || Oakland || Johnson (1–0) || || 35,077 || 1–0 
|- style="text-align:center;background-color:#ffbbbb"
| 2 || April 4 || Yankees || 3–4 || Oakland || Proctor (0–1) || || 31,284 || 1–1 
|- style="text-align:center;background-color:#ffbbbb"
| 3 || April 5 || Yankees || 4–9 || Oakland || Wright (0–1) || || 30,165 || 1–2 
|- style="text-align:center;background-color:#ffbbbb"
| 4 || April 7 || Yankees || 1–4 || Angels || Chacón (0–1) || || 44,221 || 1–3 
|- style="text-align:center;background-color:#ffbbbb"
| 5 || April 8 || Yankees || 2–3 || Angels || Johnson (1–1) || || 44,044 || 1–4 
|- style="text-align:center;background-color:#bbffbb"
| 6 || April 9 || Yankees || 10–1 || Angels || Mussina (1–0) || || 44,020 || 2–4 
|- style="text-align:center;background-color:#bbffbb"
| 7 || April 11 || Kansas City || 7–9 || Yankees || Proctor (1–1) || Rivera (1) || 54,698 || 3–4 
|- style="text-align:center;background-color:#bbffbb"
| 8 || April 12 || Kansas City || 5–12 || Yankees || Chacón (1–1) || || 41,448 || 4–4  
|- style="text-align:center;background-color:#bbffbb"
| 9 || April 13 || Kansas City || 3–9 || Yankees || Johnson (2–1) || || 54,381 || 5–4 
|- style="text-align:center;background-color:#ffbbbb"
| 10 || April 14 || Yankees || 1–5 || Minnesota || Mussina (1–1) || || 30,622 || 5–5  
|- style="text-align:center;background-color:#ffbbbb"
| 11 || April 15 || Yankees || 5–6 || Minnesota || Rivera (0–1) || || 42,316 || 5–6 
|- style="text-align:center;background-color:#bbffbb"
| 12 || April 16 || Yankees || 9–3 || Minnesota || Wang (1–0) || || 22,627 || 6–6 
|- style="text-align:center;background-color:#ffbbbb"
| 13 || April 18 || Yankees || 5–10 || Toronto || Johnson (2–2) || || 48,776 || 6–7 
|- style="text-align:center;background-color:#bbffbb"
| 14 || April 19 || Yankees || 3–1 || Toronto || Mussina (2–1) || Rivera (2) || 32,886 || 7–7 
|- style="text-align:center;background-color:#ffbbbb"
| 15 || April 21 || Baltimore || 6–5 || Yankees || Wang (1–1) || || 51,282 || 7–8  
|- style="text-align:center;background-color:#bbffbb"
| 16 || April 22 || Baltimore || 1–6 || Yankees || Chacón (2–1) || || 50,872 || 8–8 
|- style="text-align:center;background-color:#bbffbb"
| 17 || April 23 || Baltimore || 1–7 || Yankees || Johnson (3–2) || || 47,996 || 9–8 
|- style="text-align:center;background-color:#bbffbb"
| 18 || April 25 || Tampa Bay || 1–9 || Yankees || Mussina (3–1) || || 36,334 || 10–8 
|- style="text-align:center;background-color:#ffbbbb"
| 19 || April 26 || Tampa Bay || 4–2 || Yankees || Rivera (0–2) || || 35,642 || 10–9 
|- style="text-align:center;background-color:#bbffbb"
| 20 || April 27 || Tampa Bay || 1–4 || Yankees || Chacón (2–1) || Rivera (3) || 45,826 || 11–9 
|- style="text-align:center;background-color:#ffbbbb"
| 21 || April 28 || Toronto || 7–2 || Yankees || Wright (0–2) || || 47,204 || 11–10  
|- style="text-align:center;background-color:#bbffbb"
| 22 || April 29 || Toronto || 6–17 || Yankees || Johnson (4–2) || || 50,119 || 12–10 
|- style="text-align:center;background-color:#bbffbb"
| 23 || April 30 || Toronto || 1–4 || Yankees || Mussina (4–1) || Rivera (4) || 52,954 || 13–10 

|- style="text-align:center;background-color:#ffbbbb"
| 24 || May 1 || Yankees || 7–3 || Boston || Small (0–1) || || 36,339 || 13–11
|- style="text-align:center;background-color:#bbbbbb"
| – || May 2 || Yankees || || Boston || Postponed || || || 13–11
|- style="text-align:center;background-color:#bbffbb"
| 25 || May 3 || Yankees || 4–2 || Tampa Bay || Farnsworth (1–0) || Rivera (5) || 17,059 || 14–11
|- style="text-align:center;background-color:#bbffbb"
| 26 || May 4 || Yankees || 10–5 || Tampa Bay || Johnson (5–2) || || 22,164 || 15–11 
|- style="text-align:center;background-color:#bbffbb"
| 27 || May 5 || Yankees || 8–7 || Texas || Mussina (5–1) || Rivera (6) || 39,002 || 16–11  
|- style="text-align:center;background-color:#bbffbb"
| 28 || May 6 || Yankees || 6–1 || Texas || Chacón (4–1) || || 48,634 || 17–11  
|- style="text-align:center;background-color:#bbffbb"
| 29 || May 7 || Yankees || 8–5 || Texas || Wang (2–1) || || 46,013 || 18–11  
|- style="text-align:center;background-color:#ffbbbb"
| 30 || May 9 || Boston || 14–3 || Yankees || Johnson (5–3) || || 54,688 || 18–12 
|- style="text-align:center;background-color:#bbffbb"
| 31 || May 10 || Boston || 3–7 || Yankees || Mussina (6–1) || || 54,769 || 19–12  
|- style="text-align:center;background-color:#ffbbbb"
| 32 || May 11 || Boston || 5–3 || Yankees || Villone (0–1) || || 54,956 || 19–13  
|- style="text-align:center;background-color:#bbffbb"
| 33 || May 12 || Oakland || 0–2 || Yankees || Wang (3–1) || Rivera (7) || 47,797 || 20–13  
|- style="text-align:center;background-color:#bbffbb"
| 34 || May 13 || Oakland || 3–4 || Yankees || Wright (1–2) || Farnsworth (1) || 53,907 || 21–13  
|- style="text-align:center;background-color:#ffbbbb"
| 35 || May 14 || Oakland || 6–1 || Yankees || Johnson (5–4) || ||  52,587 || 21–14  
|- style="text-align:center;background-color:#ffbbbb"
| 36 || May 15 || Texas || 4–3 || Yankees || Farnsworth (1–1) || || 41,115 || 21–15  
|- style="text-align:center;background-color:#bbffbb"
| 37 || May 16 || Texas || 13–14 || Yankees || Rivera (1–2) || || 40,757 || 22–15  
|- style="text-align:center;background-color:#bbffbb"
| 38 || May 17 || Texas || 3–4 || Yankees || Wang (4–1) || Rivera (8) || 52,547 || 23–15  
|- style="text-align:center;background-color:#ffbbbb"
| 39 || May 18 || Texas || 6–2 || Yankees || Wright (1–3) || || 47,194 || 23–16 
|- style="text-align:center;background-color:#ffbbbb"
| 40 || May 19 || Yankees || 6–7 || Mets || Rivera (1–3) || || 56,289 || 23–17  
|- style="text-align:center;background-color:#bbffbb"
| 41 || May 20 || Yankees || 5–4 || Mets || Rivera (2–3) || || 56,185 || 24–17  
|- style="text-align:center;background-color:#ffbbbb"
| 42 || May 21 || Yankees || 3–4 || Mets || Small (0–2) || || 56,205 || 24–18  
|- style="text-align:center;background-color:#ffbbbb"
| 43 || May 22 || Yankees || 5–9 || Boston || Wang (4–2) || || 36,342 || 24–19  
|- style="text-align:center;background-color:#bbffbb"
| 44 || May 23 || Yankees || 7–5 || Boston || Wright (2–3) || Rivera (9) || 36,290 || 25–19  
|- style="text-align:center;background-color:#bbffbb"
| 45 || May 24 || Yankees || 8–6 || Boston || Johnson (6–4) || Rivera (10) || 36,375 || 26–19  
|- style="text-align:center;background-color:#ffbbbb"
| 46 || May 26 || Kansas City || 7–6 || Yankees || Farnsworth (1–2) || || 48,035 || 26–20
|- style="text-align:center;background-color:#bbffbb"
| 47 || May 27 || Kansas City || 4–15 || Yankees || Wang (5–2) || || 54,216 || 27–20  
|- style="text-align:center;background-color:#bbffbb"
| 48 || May 28 || Kansas City || 5–6 || Yankees || Wright (3–3) || Rivera (11) || 54,372 || 28–20  
|- style="text-align:center;background-color:#bbffbb"
| 49 || May 29 || Yankees || 4–0 || Detroit || Johnson (7–4) || || 39,759 || 29–20 
|- style="text-align:center;background-color:#bbffbb"
| 50 || May 30 || Yankees || 11–6 || Detroit || Rivera (3–3) || || 24,765 || 30–20 
|- style="text-align:center;background-color:#bbffbb"
| 51 || May 31 || Yankees || 6–1 || Detroit || Mussina (7–1) || || 23,737 || 31–20 

|- style="text-align:center;background-color:#ffbbbb"
| 52 || June 1 || Yankees || 6–7 || Detroit || Farnsworth (1–3) || || 27,231 || 31–21
|- style="text-align:center;background-color:#bbffbb"
| 53 || June 2 || Yankees || 6–5 || Baltimore || Farnsworth (2–3) || || 48,168 || 32–21
|- style="text-align:center;background-color:#bbffbb"
| 54 || June 3 || Yankees || 6–5 || Baltimore || Proctor (2–1) || Wang (1) || 48,195 || 33–21
|- style="text-align:center;background-color:#ffbbbb"
| 55 || June 4 || Yankees || 4–11 || Baltimore || Small (0–3) || || 47,535 || 33–22 
|- style="text-align:center;background-color:#bbffbb"
| 56 || June 5 || Boston || 5–13 || Yankees || Mussina (8–1) || || 55,246 || 34–22  
|- style="text-align:center;background-color:#bbffbb"
| 57 || June 6 || Boston || 1–2 || Yankees || Wang (6–2) || Rivera (12) || 55,141 || 35–22  
|- style="text-align:center;background-color:#bbbbbb"
| – || June 7 || Boston ||  || Yankees || Postponed || || ||    35–22  
|- style="text-align:center;background-color:#ffbbbb"
| 58 || June 8 || Boston || 9–3 || Yankees || Wright (3–4) || || 55,225 || 35–23 
|- style="text-align:center;background-color:#ffbbbb"
| 59 || June 9 || Oakland || 6–5 || Yankees || Johnson (7–5) || || 53,837 || 35–24 
|- style="text-align:center;background-color:#ffbbbb"
| 60 || June 10 || Oakland || 5–2 || Yankees || Mussina (8–2) || || 53,779 || 35–25  
|- style="text-align:center;background-color:#ffbbbb"
| 61 || June 11 || Oakland || 6–5 || Yankees || Farnsworth (2–4) || || 54,570 || 35–26  
|- style="text-align:center;background-color:#bbffbb"
| 62 || June 13 || Cleveland || 0–1 || Yankees || Wang (7–2) || Rivera (13) || 50,365 || 36–26  
|- style="text-align:center;background-color:#bbffbb"
| 63 || June 14 || Cleveland || 1–6 || Yankees || Johnson (7–5)  || || 53,448 || 37–26  
|- style="text-align:center;background-color:#ffbbbb"
| 64 || June 15 || Cleveland || 8–4 || Yankees || Mussina (8–3) || || 54,648 || 37–27  
|- style="text-align:center;background-color:#bbffbb"
| 65 || June 16 || Yankees || 7–5 || Washington || Rivera (4–3) || || 44,749 || 38–27  
|- style="text-align:center;background-color:#ffbbbb"
| 66 || June 17 || Yankees || 9–11 || Washington || Rivera (4–4) || || 45,085 || 38–28  
|- style="text-align:center;background-color:#ffbbbb"
| 67 || June 18 || Yankees || 2–3 || Washington || Wang (7–3)  || || 45,157 || 38–29 
|- style="text-align:center;background-color:#ffbbbb"
| 68 || June 19 || Yankees || 2–4 || Philadelphia || Johnson (8–6) || || 44,747 || 38–30 
|- style="text-align:center;background-color:#bbffbb"
| 69 || June 20 || Yankees || 9–7 || Philadelphia || Beam (1–0) || Rivera (14) || 44,775 || 39–30  
|- style="text-align:center;background-color:#bbffbb"
| 70 || June 21 || Yankees || 5–0 || Philadelphia || Wright (4–4) || || 45,111 || 40–30  
|- style="text-align:center;background-color:#bbffbb"
| 71 || June 23 || Florida || 5–6 || Yankees || Wang (8–3) || Rivera (15) || 54,025 || 41–30  
|- style="text-align:center;background-color:#bbbbbb"
| – || June 24 || Florida ||  || Yankees || Postponed || || ||   41–30  
|- style="text-align:center;background-color:#bbffbb"
| 72 || June 25 || Florida || 1–2 || Yankees || Mussina (9–3) || Rivera (16) || 53,615 || 42–30  
|- style="text-align:center;background-color:#bbffbb"
| 73 || June 25 || Florida || 1–2 || Yankees || Chacón (4–2) || || 6,809 || 42–31  
|- style="text-align:center;background-color:#bbffbb"
| 74 || June 26 || Atlanta || 2–5 || Yankees || Johnson (9–6) || Rivera (17)|| 54,226 || 43–31
|- style="text-align:center;background-color:#ffbbbb"
| 75 || June 27 || Atlanta || 5–2 || Yankees || Wright (4–5) || || 53,763 || 43–32  
|- style="text-align:center;background-color:#bbffbb"
| 76 || June 28 || Atlanta || 3–4 || Yankees || Villone (1–1) || || 54,186 || 44–32  
|- style="text-align:center;background-color:#bbffbb"
| 77 || June 30 || Mets || 0–2 || Yankees || Villone (2–1) || Rivera (18) || 55,245 || 45–32 

|- style="text-align:center;background-color:#ffbbbb"
| 78 || July 1 || Mets || 8–3 || Yankees || Johnson (9–7) || || 55,132 || 45–33
|- style="text-align:center;background-color:#bbffbb"
| 79 || July 2 || Mets || 7–16 || Yankees || Villone (3–1) || || 55,212 || 46–33
|- style="text-align:center;background-color:#ffbbbb"
| 80 || July 3 || Yankees || 2–5 || Cleveland || Wang (8–4) ||  || 42,706 || 46–34
|- style="text-align:center;background-color:#ffbbbb"
| 81 || July 4 || Yankees || 1–19 || Cleveland || Chacón (4–3) || || 29,638 || 46–35 
|- style="text-align:center;background-color:#bbffbb"
| 82 || July 5 || Yankees || 11–3 || Cleveland || Mussina (10–3) || || 31,265 || 47–35  
|- style="text-align:center;background-color:#bbffbb"
| 83 || July 6 || Yankees || 10–4 || Cleveland || Johnson (10–7) || || 34,982 || 48–35  
|- style="text-align:center;background-color:#bbffbb"
| 84 || July 7 || Yankees || 1–0 || Tampa Bay || Wright (5–5) || Rivera (19) || 25,584 || 49–35  
|- style="text-align:center;background-color:#bbffbb"
| 85 || July 8 || Yankees || 5–1 || Tampa Bay || Wang (9–4) || || 34,982 || 50–35  
|- style="text-align:center;background-color:#ffbbbb"
| 86 || July 9 || Yankees || 5–6 || Tampa Bay || Proctor (2–2) || || 31,583 || 50–36 
|- style="text-align:center;background-color:#bbffbb"
| 87 || July 14 || White Sox || 5–6 || Yankees || Farnsworth (3–4) || Rivera (20) || 55,069 || 51–36  
|- style="text-align:center;background-color:#bbffbb"
| 88 || July 15 || White Sox || 3–14 || Yankees || Mussina (11–3) || || 55,019 || 52–36  
|- style="text-align:center;background-color:#bbffbb"
| 89 || July 16 || White Sox || 4–6 || Yankees || Wright (6–5) || Rivera (21) || 53,781 || 53–36 
|- style="text-align:center;background-color:#bbffbb"
| 90 || July 17 || Seattle || 2–4 || Yankees || Wang (10–4) || Rivera (22) || 53,444 || 54–36 
|- style="text-align:center;background-color:#bbffbb"
| 91 || July 18 || Seattle || 4–5 || Yankees || Proctor (3–2) || || 52,992 || 55–36
|- style="text-align:center;background-color:#ffbbbb"
| 92 || July 19 || Seattle || 3–2 || Yankees || Johnson (10–8) || || 54,121 || 55–37 
|- style="text-align:center;background-color:#ffbbbb"
| 93 || July 20 || Yankees || 4–5 || Toronto || Rivera (4–5) || || 42,336 || 55–38 
|- style="text-align:center;background-color:#ffbbbb"
| 94 || July 21 || Yankees || 3–7 || Toronto || Wright (6–6) || || 40,149 || 55–39  
|- style="text-align:center;background-color:#bbffbb"
| 95 || July 22 || Yankees || 5–4 || Toronto || Wang (11–4) || Rivera (23) || 50,014 || 56–39  
|- style="text-align:center;background-color:#ffbbbb"
| 96 || July 23 || Yankees || 5–13 || Toronto || Ponson (0–1) || || 42,337 || 56–40  
|- style="text-align:center;background-color:#bbffbb"
| 97 || July 24 || Yankees || 6–2 || Texas || Johnson (11–8) ||  || 43,206 || 57–40 
|- style="text-align:center;background-color:#bbffbb"
| 98 || July 25 || Yankees || 7–4 || Texas || Mussina (12–3) || Rivera (24) || 42,171 || 58–40  
|- style="text-align:center;background-color:#bbffbb"
| 99 || July 26 || Yankees || 8–7 || Texas || Chacón (4–3) || Rivera (25) || 43,527 || 59–40
|- style="text-align:center;background-color:#bbffbb"
| 100 || July 28 || Tampa Bay || 0–6 || Yankees || Wang (12–4) || || 53,979 || 60–40  
|- style="text-align:center;background-color:#ffbbbb"
| 101 || July 29 || Tampa Bay || 19–6 || Yankees || Johnson (11–9) || || 54,485 || 60–41
|- style="text-align:center;background-color:#bbffbb"
| 102 || July 30 || Tampa Bay || 2–4 || Yankees || Mussina (13–3) || Rivera (26) || 54,102 || 61–41 

|- style="text-align:center;background-color:#bbffbb"
| 103 || August 1 || Toronto || 1–5 || Yankees || Wright (7–6) || || 52,237 || 62–41
|- style="text-align:center;background-color:#bbffbb"
| 104 || August 2 || Toronto || 2–7 || Yankees || Wang (13–4) || || 54,414 || 63–41
|- style="text-align:center;background-color:#bbffbb"
| 105 || August 3 || Toronto || 1–8 || Yankees || Lidle (1–0) ||  || 52,156 || 64–41
|- style="text-align:center;background-color:#bbffbb"
| 106 || August 4 || Yankees || 5–4 || Baltimore || Proctor (4–2) || Rivera (27) || 44,840 || 65–41 
|- style="text-align:center;background-color:#ffbbbb"
| 107 || August 5 || Yankees || 0–5 || Baltimore || Mussina (13–4) || || 49,159 || 65–42  
|- style="text-align:center;background-color:#bbffbb"
| 108 || August 6 || Yankees || 6–1 || Baltimore || Wright (8–6) || Rivera (28)|| 45,563 || 66–42  
|- style="text-align:center;background-color:#ffbbbb"
| 109 || August 8 || Yankees || 5–6 || White Sox || Proctor (4–3) || || 39,872 || 66–43  
|- style="text-align:center;background-color:#bbffbb"
| 110 || August 9 || Yankees || 7–6 || White Sox || Johnson (12–9) || Rivera (29) || 39,406 || 66–44 
|- style="text-align:center;background-color:#ffbbbb"
| 111 || August 10 || Yankees || 4–5 || White Sox || Mussina (13–5) || || 39,289 || 67–44  
|- style="text-align:center;background-color:#ffbbbb"
| 112 || August 11 || Angels || 7–4 || Yankees || Lidle (1–1) || || 54,450 || 67–45
|- style="text-align:center;background-color:#bbffbb"
| 113 || August 12 || Angels || 2–5 || Yankees || Wright (9–6) || Rivera (30) || 54,157 || 68–45 
|- style="text-align:center;background-color:#ffbbbb"
| 114 || August 13 || Angels || 5–3 || Yankees || Wang (13–5) || || 54,309 || 68–46
|- style="text-align:center;background-color:#bbffbb"
| 115 || August 14 || Angels || 2–7 || Yankees || Johnson (13–9) || || 52,100 || 69–46  
|- style="text-align:center;background-color:#bbffbb"
| 116 || August 15 || Baltimore || 3–6 || Yankees || Mussina (11–3) || Rivera (31) || 52,418 || 70–46  
|- style="text-align:center;background-color:#ffbbbb"
| 117 || August 16 || Baltimore || 3–2 || Yankees || Proctor (5–3) || || 54,244 || 70–47 
|- style="text-align:center;background-color:#ffbbbb"
| 118 || August 17 || Baltimore || 12–2 || Yankees || Lidle (1–2) || || 54,333 || 70–48 
|- style="text-align:center;background-color:#bbffbb"
| 119 || August 18 || Yankees || 12–4 || Boston || Wang (14–5) || || 36,325 || 71–48
|- style="text-align:center;background-color:#bbffbb"
| 120 || August 18 || Yankees || 14–11 || Boston || Myers (1–0) || || 36,071 || 72–48
|- style="text-align:center;background-color:#bbffbb"
| 121 || August 19 || Yankees || 13–5 || Boston || Johnson (14–9) || || 35,738 || 73–48 
|- style="text-align:center;background-color:#bbffbb"
| 122 || August 20 || Yankees || 8–5 || Boston || Rivera (5–5) || || 36,155 || 74–48 
|- style="text-align:center;background-color:#bbffbb"
| 123 || August 21 || Yankees || 2–1 || Boston || Lidle (2–2) || Farnsworth (2) || 35,829 || 75–48 
|- style="text-align:center;background-color:#ffbbbb"
| 124 || August 22 || Yankees || 5–6 || Seattle || Villone (3–2) || || 42,454 || 75–49  
|- style="text-align:center;background-color:#bbffbb"
| 125 || August 23 || Yankees || 9–2 || Seattle || Wang (15–5) || || 41,380 || 76–49  
|- style="text-align:center;background-color:#ffbbbb"
| 126 || August 24 || Yankees || 2–4 || Seattle || Johnson (14–10) ||  || 44,634 || 76–50 
|- style="text-align:center;background-color:#ffbbbb"
| 127 || August 25 || Yankees || 5–6 || Angels || Myers (1–1) || || 44,253 || 77–51  
|- style="text-align:center;background-color:#ffbbbb"
| 128 || August 26 || Yankees || 7–12 || Angels || Bruney (0–1) || || 44,185 || 78–52
|- style="text-align:center;background-color:#bbffbb"
| 129 || August 27 || Yankees || 11–8 || Angels || Karstens (1–0) || || 44,225 || 79–52 
|- style="text-align:center;background-color:#bbbbbb"
| – || August 29 || Yankees || || Detroit || Postponed || || ||  79–52 
|- style="text-align:center;background-color:#bbffbb"
| 130 || August 30 || Yankees || 2–0 || Detroit || Wang (16–5) || Rivera (32) || 52,585 || 80–52 
|- style="text-align:center;background-color:#ffbbbb"
| 131 || August 30 || Yankees || 3–5 || Detroit || Proctor (5–4) || || 54,509 || 80–53
|- style="text-align:center;background-color:#bbffbb"
| 132 || August 31 || Yankees || 6–4 || Detroit || Johnson (15–10) || Rivera (33)|| 54,771 || 81–53

|- style="text-align:center;background-color:#bbffbb"
| 133 || September 1 || Minnesota || 1–8 || Yankees || Lidle (3–2) || || 54,311 || 80–53
|- style="text-align:center;background-color:#ffbbbb"
| 134 || September 2 || Minnesota || 6–1 || Yankees || Karstens (1–1) || || 53,220 || 80–54
|- style="text-align:center;background-color:#bbffbb"
| 135 || September 3 || Minnesota || 1–10 || Yankees || Rasner (1–0) ||  || 55,155 || 81–54
|- style="text-align:center;background-color:#bbffbb"
| 136 || September 4 || Yankees || 12–5 || Kansas City || Beam (2–0) || || 27,123 || 82–54 
|- style="text-align:center;background-color:#ffbbbb"
| 137 || September 5 || Yankees || 0–5 || Kansas City || Mussina (13–6) || || 25,104 || 82–55  
|- style="text-align:center;background-color:#bbffbb"
| 138 || September 6 || Yankees || 8–3 || Kansas City || Johnson (16–10) ||  || 16,421 || 83–55  
|- style="text-align:center;background-color:#ffbbbb"
| 139 || September 8 || Yankees || 4–9 || Baltimore || Lidle (3–3) || || 36,214 || 83–56  
|- style="text-align:center;background-color:#bbffbb"
| 140 || September 9 || Yankees || 3–2 || Baltimore || Wang (17–5) || Farnsworth (3)|| 45,827 || 84–56 
|- style="text-align:center;background-color:#bbffbb"
| 141 || September 10 || Yankees || 9–4 || Baltimore || Wright (10–7) || || 40,125 || 85–56
|- style="text-align:center;background-color:#bbffbb"
| 142 || September 11 || Yankees || 9–6 || Baltimore || Johnson (17–10) || Farnsworth (4) || 21,742 || 86–56 
|- style="text-align:center;background-color:#bbffbb"
| 143 || September 12 || Tampa Bay || 4–12 || Yankees || Mussina (14–6) || || 54,570 || 87–56 
|- style="text-align:center;background-color:#bbffbb"
| 144 || September 13 || Tampa Bay || 4–8 || Yankees || Bruney (1–1) || || 52,265 || 88–56
|- style="text-align:center;background-color:#bbffbb"
| 145 || September 14 || Tampa Bay || 4–7 || Yankees || Rasner (2–0) || || 51,965 || 89–56  
|- style="text-align:center;background-color:#bbbbbb"
| – || September 15 || Boston || || Yankees || Postponed || ||  ||    89–56  
|- style="text-align:center;background-color:#ffbbbb"
| 146 || September 16 || Boston || 5–2 || Yankees || Wang (17–6) || || 55,091 || 89–57  
|- style="text-align:center;background-color:#bbffbb"
| 147 || September 16 || Boston || 5–7 || Yankees || Proctor (6–4) || Farnsworth (5) || 55,167 || 90–57  
|- style="text-align:center;background-color:#ffbbbb"
| 148 || September 17 || Boston || 6–3 || Yankees || Villone (3–3) || || 55,002 || 90–58  
|- style="text-align:center;background-color:#ffbbbb"
| 149 || September 17 || Boston || 5–4 || Yankees || Farnsworth (3–5) || || 55,221 || 90–59
|- style="text-align:center;background-color:#bbffbb"
| 150 || September 18 || Yankees || 7–6 || Toronto || Rasner (3–0) || Veras (1) || 32,286 || 91–59  
|- style="text-align:center;background-color:#bbffbb"
| 151 || September 19 || Yankees || 6–3 || Toronto || Karstens (2–1) || Farnsworth (6) || 30,793 || 92–59 
|- style="text-align:center;background-color:#ffbbbb"
| 152 || September 20 || Yankees || 2–3 || Toronto || Henn (0–1) || || 33,029 || 92–60  
|- style="text-align:center;background-color:#bbffbb"
| 153 || September 22 || Yankees || 4–1 || Tampa Bay || Wang (18–6) || Rivera (34) || 26,337 || 93–60 
|- style="text-align:center;background-color:#ffbbbb"
| 154 || September 23 || Yankees || 0–8 || Tampa Bay || Johnson (17–11) || || 33,492 || 93–61  
|- style="text-align:center;background-color:#ffbbbb"
| 155 || September 24 || Yankees || 4–11 || Tampa Bay || Mussina (14–7) || || 31,422 || 93–62  
|- style="text-align:center;background-color:#bbffbb"
| 156 || September 25 || Yankees || 16–1 || Tampa Bay || Wright (11–7) || || 24,053 || 94–62  
|- style="text-align:center;background-color:#bbffbb"
| 157 || September 26 || Baltimore || 4–5 || Yankees || Lidle (4–3) || Proctor (1) || 53,420 || 95–62
|- style="text-align:center;background-color:#bbffbb"
| 158 || September 27 || Baltimore || 5–16 || Yankees || Wang (19–6) || || 53,040 || 96–62  
|- style="text-align:center;background-color:#ffbbbb"
| 159 || September 28 || Baltimore || 7–1 || Yankees || Rasner (3–1) || || 54,046 || 96–63  
|- style="text-align:center;background-color:#bbffbb"
| 160 || September 29 || Toronto || 2–7 || Yankees || Mussina (15–7) || || 52,331 || 97–63  
|- style="text-align:center;background-color:#ffbbbb"
| 161 || September 30 || Toronto || 6–5 || Yankees || Myers (1–2) || || 54,576 || 97–64 

|- style="text-align:center;background-color:#ffbbbb"
| 162 || October 1 || Toronto || 5–7 || Yankees || Farnsworth (3–6) || || 54,886 || 97–65

Player stats

Batting

Note: G = Games played; AB = At bats; H = Hits; Avg. = Batting average; HR = Home runs; RBI = Runs batted in

Pitching

Starting and other pitchers
Note: G = Games pitched; W = Wins; L = Losses; ERA = Earned run average; SO = Strikeouts

Relief pitchers
Note: G = Games pitched; W = Wins; L = Losses; SV = Saves; ERA = Earned run average; SO = Strikeouts

Playoffs

American League Division Series
The 2006 American League Division Series was played between New York Yankees and Detroit Tigers. New York finished 1st in the American League East, while Detroit won the wild card. Detroit ended up winning the series 3-1.

Farm system

LEAGUE CHAMPIONS: Staten Island

References

Game Logs:
1st Half: New York Yankees Game Log on ESPN.com
2nd Half: New York Yankees Game Log on ESPN.com
Playoffs: New York Yankees Game Log on ESPN.com
Batting Statistics: New York Yankees Batting Stats on ESPN.com
Pitching Statistics: New York Yankees Pitching Stats on ESPN.com
2006 New York Yankees at Baseball Reference
2006 New York Yankees team page at www.baseball-almanac.com

New York Yankees seasons
New York Yankees
New York Yankees
2000s in the Bronx
American League East champion seasons